Ombili, which means peace in Oshivambo, can refer to the following:
 a small, undeveloped area in Katutura, Windhoek
 a suburb of Mariental, Namibia
 a foundation north of Tsumeb, aimed at improving living conditions for the San people in Namibia